Hougoumont was a fortified farm held by Wellington's army in the Battle of Waterloo.

Hougoumont, Hougomont, or variation may also refer to:

 Hougoumont (ship), a convict ship;
 Hougomont (barque), a barque built in 1897
 Biere d' Hougoumont, a Biere de Garde (strong ale) made by Brewery Ommegang of Cooperstown, NY, United States
 Hougomont, a painting of the Battle of Waterloo at Hougoumont by Robert Gibb

See also

 Goumont (disambiguation)
 Gomont (disambiguation)